The Bowling Green Metropolitan Statistical Area, as defined by the United States Census Bureau, is an area consisting of four counties in Kentucky, anchored by the city of Bowling Green. As of 2014, the MSA had an estimated population of 165,732.

Counties
Allen
Butler
Edmonson
Warren

Communities

Incorporated places
Bowling Green (Principal city)
Brownsville
Morgantown
Oakland
Plum Springs
Rochester
Scottsville
Smiths Grove
Woodburn
Woodbury

Unincorporated places
Aberdeen
Adolphus
Anna
Alvaton
Asphalt
Bee Spring
Big Reedy
Chalybeate Springs
Dunbar
Glenmore
Hadley
Holland
Huff
Jetson
Lindseyville
Meador
Pig
Plano
Quality
Reedyville
Rhoda
Richpond
Rockfield
Rocky Hill
Roundhill
Segal
Sunfish
Sweeden
Threeforks
Windyville
Wingfield

Demographics
As of the census of 2000, there were 104,166 people, 40,013 households, and 26,873 families residing within the MSA. The racial makeup of the MSA was 88.25% White, 7.68% African American, 0.26% Native American, 1.21% Asian, 0.07% Pacific Islander, 1.19% from other races, and 1.35% from two or more races. Hispanic or Latino of any race were 2.43% of the population.

The median income for a household in the MSA was $30,782, and the median income for a family was $38,493. Males had a median income of $29,417 versus $19,968 for females. The per capita income for the MSA was $16,664.

See also
Kentucky census statistical areas

References

External links